Once Upon a Time in Phuket (Swedish: En gång i Phuket) is a 2012 Swedish film directed by Staffan Lindberg.

Synopsis
Sven (Peter Magnusson), an average Swede, from Vallentuna, is bored with his life and wants to experience new adventures. He travels to Thailand to write a novel and in the process gets to meet a range of peculiar characters and learns a few things about love, friendship and himself.

Young, fresh comedy from Sweden. Career coach Sven is fed up with constantly improving other people's lives. Now it's his turn! While family and friends are still smiling about his plans, Sven is already packing his things, quitting his job and flying to Thailand to write a book. On the beach he meets interesting ones. crazy. inspiring and charming people ...

Cast
 Peter Magnusson as Sven
 Susanne Thorson as Anja
 Jenny Skavlan as Gitte
 David Hellenius as Georg
 Grynet Molvig as Sven's mother
 Alexandra Rapaport as Siri
 Claes Månsson as the priest
 Frida Westerdahl as Estelle
 Frida Hallgren as Karin
 Matias Varela as Jean-Luc
 Henrik Norlén as Johan Pålman
 Yngve Dahlberg as Druve
 Johan Hallström as Magnus
 Mårten Klingberg as Fredrik
 Ella Fogelström as Sonja
 Lisbeth Johansson

External links
 
 
 

Swedish romantic comedy films
2012 films
Films set in Thailand
2010s Swedish-language films
2010s Swedish films